Fernando D'Amico (born 10 February 1975) is an Argentine retired footballer.

He is the brother of Patricio D'Amico.

References

1975 births
Living people
Argentine footballers
Association football midfielders
All Boys footballers
Huracán Corrientes footballers
Quilmes Atlético Club footballers
CD Badajoz players
Lille OSC players
Le Mans FC players
Pontevedra CF footballers
Ethnikos Piraeus F.C. players
CF Extremadura footballers
Argentine expatriate footballers
Expatriate footballers in Spain
Argentine expatriate sportspeople in Spain
Expatriate footballers in France
Argentine expatriate sportspeople in France
Expatriate footballers in Greece
Argentine expatriate sportspeople in Greece
Ligue 1 players
Ligue 2 players
Segunda División players
Gamma Ethniki players
Footballers from Buenos Aires